Samuel Siegel (born 1875, Des Moines, Iowa — died January 14, 1948, Los Angeles, California) was an American mandolin virtuoso and composer who played mandolin on 29 records for Victor Records, including 9 pieces of his own composition and two that he arranged. Siegel was the first mandolinist to record on Emile Berliner's phonograph disk-records. He was labeled "America's Greatest Mandoline Virtuoso" and "The King of the Mandolin" in the May 1900 Banjo World.

Siegel performed both in vaudeville, as well as in concert halls. He had no formal training in music, but saw that the mandolin needed original music, rather than relying on the transcribed violin music. His compositions and arrangements were well known in his day.

He was the author of Siegel's Special Mandolin Studies, published by Joseph W. Stern & Co., 1901, in which he covered left-hand Pizzicato and harmonic duo style.

Recording partners
Siegel recorded with Roy Butin in 1908 on four Victor records, the tunes: Southern Fantasy, Estellita Waltz, American Valor March, and In Fairyland.

He recorded Edison Diamond Disk record Ragtime Echoes in 1918 with Marie Caveny, with her on ukulele, and also Dance, Mouse Dance, and Medley. Marie and her husband James Frank Caveny lived with Siegel as lodgers in Chicago during the 1910 United States Census. They were performers or lecturers in the Lyceum movement. James Franklin was a cartoonist and Marie sang soprano in their performance.

Victor recordings

Recorded for Victor records between October 20, 1900 and December 28, 1918.
 The foxhunters two-step
 Espagnole waltz
 Hawthorne club
 Remembrance of thee
 Medley of coon songs
 Ma lady Lou
 Volunteer patrol
 American valor march
 La bonita waltz
 Romance
 In olden times
 Nearer my God to thee
 Manzanillo
 An autumn evening
 A-sa-ma
 Maritana mazurka
 Navajo medley
 La cinquantaine
 Träumerei
 Intermezzo
 The whirlwind march
 Boston Ideal march
 Estellita waltz
 American valor march
 In Fairyland
 Medley, (December 28, 1918) with Marie Caveny (ukulele)
 Dance, (December 28, 1918) with Marie Caveny (ukulele)
 Ragtime echoes, (December 28, 1918) with Marie Caveny (ukulele)
 Mouse dance, (December 28, 1918) with Marie Caveny (ukulele)

Columbia Records
He made records for Columbia Records.
 La bonita waltz (1901), Samuel Siegel (mandolin)
 Zenda waltz (1901), Samuel Siegel (mandolin)
 Hawthorne Club (c 1904-1909), Samuel Siegel (mandolin)
 Ivanhoe Intermezzo with Geo. Stehl & Hans Von Wegern
 Mazurka Brillante

Edison recordings
He recorded for Edison Records on their Blue Amberol, Gold Moulded, and Diamond Disk albums.

Gold Molded
 Home, sweet home (1902), Samuel Siegel (mandolin)
 Manzanilo (c. 1902), Samuel Siegel (mandolin)
 The story teller waltz (1903), Samuel Siegel (mandolin)
 My Old Kentucky Home (1903), Samuel Siegel (mandolin)
 Just One Girl (1904), Samuel Siegel (mandolin)<ref name=youtube>[https://www.youtube.com/watch?v=QaO57wMbtCk YouTube video of Just One Girl by Samuel Siegel, showing the recording case and label]</ref>(Music written by Lynn Udall, 1898)
 An autumn evening (1905), Samuel Siegel (mandolin) and M. Loyd Wolf (guitar)
 Evening on the plaza (1905), Samuel Siegel (mandolin)

Blue Amberol
 Castilian Echoes (1908), Samuel Siegel (mandolin) and William Smith (guitar)
 Waltz (1909), Samuel Siegel (mandolin) and Roy H. Butin (guitar)
 Gavotte (1909), Samuel Siegel (mandolin) and Roy H. Butin (guitar)
 Waltz (1913), Samuel Siegel (mandolin) and Roy H. Butin (guitar)
 Kuu ipo i ka hee pue one medley (1919), Samuel Siegel (mandolin) and Marie Caveny (ukulele)

Diamond
 Ragtime Echoes (1918), Samuel Siegel (mandolin) and Marie Caveny (ukulele)

Indestructible Records
He made records marketed by the Indestructible Record Company.
 Estellita waltz (1908), Samuel Siegel (mandolin) and Roy Butin (guitar)
 Southern fantasie'' (1908), Samuel Siegel (mandolin) and Roy Butin (guitar)

See also
 List of mandolinists (sorted)

References

External links
 
 
 Samuel Siegel recordings at the Discography of American Historical Recordings.
 Library of Congress record listing digitized recordings in their collection by Siegel
 Library of Congress record and online stream of Navajo Medley, arranged and played by Siegel
 Library of Congress record for a recording Siegel made of his arrangement of Nearer My God to Thee
 Mandolin Cafe thread with pictures of a program of music in which Siegel played
 Cylinder preservation and Digitization Project, University of California, has digitized Siegel public-domain recordings and made available to download.
 Advertisement for Siegel's mandolin method
 Mandotopia page, has links to public domain book of mandolin music, arranged by Siegel
 A recital program cover for Samuel Siegel
 Website for a mandolin teacher which contains one page of Siegel's method book
 Endorsement by Samuel Siegel of Regal mandolins. also details of one of his transcontinental tours
 Advertisement for Siegel's music school, the Siegel–Myers School of Music (then also named University Extension Conservatory)

American classical mandolinists
American male composers
American music arrangers
American performance artists
Classical musicians from California
Columbia Records artists
Edison Records artists
Musicians from Des Moines, Iowa
Musicians from Los Angeles
Pioneer recording artists
Victor Records artists
1875 births
1948 deaths
20th-century American composers
20th-century American male musicians